Dmitry Vladimirovich Tikhonov (born 13 September 1988) is a former soccer player from Russia. His position was striker.

References

1988 births
Footballers from Moscow
Living people
Russian footballers
PFC CSKA Moscow players
Russian Premier League players
Association football forwards
FC Sportakademklub Moscow players
FC Mashuk-KMV Pyatigorsk players